Crema or Cremas  may refer to:

Crema
 Crema, Lombardy, a comune in the northern Italian province of Cremona
 Crema (coffee), a thin layer of foam at the top of a cup of espresso
 Crema (dairy product), the Spanish word for cream
 Cremà, a part of the Fallas festivity

Cremas
 Crémas, a sweet and creamy alcoholic beverage native to Haiti
 Los Cremas, a Peruvian football club

See also
 Cream (disambiguation)